Saul Griffith (born 1974) is an Australian-American inventor and renewable electricity advocate. He is the founder or co-founder of multiple companies, including Otherlab (where he is currently CEO), Makani Power, and Instructables.

Education
In 2000, Griffith graduated from the University of Sydney with a Master of Engineering degree. He won a scholarship to MIT Media Lab to study towards a PhD that he completed in 2004. The subject of his PhD thesis was "self-replicating machines". They were one of the first instances of artificial replication being demonstrated using real physics.

Projects
Griffith is the co-founder and CEO of OtherLab, a research and development company working on computational manufacturing and design tools and applying those tools to projects such as inflatable pneumatic robots and prostheses, novel approaches to heliostat design, and applications of computational origami to the design of pressure vessels (e.g. for compressed natural gas) in arbitrary shapes. Otherlab's R&D is guided by a vast map of energy flows in the US economy, which they use to identify key leverage points in building a more sustainable energy economy.

Griffith used this energy flow mapping for Rewiring America, a nonprofit organization working on electrification. He argues that the United States can create 30 million jobs, save consumers money, boost energy resiliency, and accelerate achievement of a net zero economy.

Previously, he was a co-founder of Squid Labs, and its spinout companies and projects Makani Power, Instructables, Wattzon, HowToons, OptiOpia, Potenco, Sunfolding, Other Machine Company and Monkeylectric.

Personal life
Griffith used to live in San Francisco. As of 2022, he has relocated to Australia, living in Wollongong.

He is married to Tim O'Reilly's daughter Arwen. He has two children.

Griffith's mother is a wildlife artist, early Greenpeace activist and printmaker, while his father is a retired professor. 

A portrait of Griffith by artist Jude Rae was highly commended in the 2022 Archibald Prize.

Publications 

 Electrify: An Optimist's Playbook for Our Clean Energy Future (2021). Cambridge, Massachusetts: MIT University Press. ISBN 9780262046237 (Hardcover edition).

References

External links
 
 The big switch

1974 births
Living people
Australian emigrants to the United States
MacArthur Fellows
Massachusetts Institute of Technology alumni
Businesspeople from San Francisco
People from Sydney
Sustainability advocates
University of New South Wales alumni
University of Sydney alumni
Wind power
21st-century American inventors